The Stained glass windows in the Sint Janskerk can be viewed by visitors after paying a modest entrance fee. The earliest windows date from 1555, three years after a destructive fire laid waste to the earlier church built in the same place. The creation of stained glass windows was temporarily halted in 1572 following Gouda's decision to side with the Protestant faction in the Eighty Years' War, but the process was resumed a few years later with windows of a different and more worldly character. As a result, the church features stained glass windows from both Roman Catholic and Protestant donors – a highly unusual combination. The most treasured is the series of windows around the Choir that portray the life of John the Baptist, the city's patron saint, in parallel with that of Jesus Christ.

North transept

Choir

South transept

Literature

 Henny VAN HARTEN-BOERS & Zsuzsanna VAN RUYVEN-ZEMAN, The Stained-Glass Windows in the Sint-Janskerk at Gouda. The glazing of the Clerestory of the Choir and of the former Monastic Church of the Regulars, Amsterdam, 1997.
 Zsuzsanna VAN RUYVEN-ZEMAN, The Stained-Glass Windows in the Sint-Janskerk at Gouda, 1556–1604, Amsterdam, 2000
 Xander VAN ECK & Christiane E. COEBERGH, The Stained-Glass Windows in the Sint-Janskerk at Gouda. Dirk and Wouter Crabeth, Amsterdam, 2002
 Zsuzsanna VAN RUYVEN-ZEMAN, Xander VAN ECK & Henny VAN DOLDER – DE WIT, Het geheim van Gouda: de cartons van de Goudse glazen, Zutphen (Walburg Pers) 2002, 

Janskerk, Gouda
History of Gouda, South Holland